Gunfight at the O.K. Corral is a 1957 American Western film starring Burt Lancaster as Wyatt Earp and Kirk Douglas as Doc Holliday, and loosely based on the actual event in 1881. The film was directed by John Sturges from a screenplay written by novelist Leon Uris.It was a remake of the 1939 film Frontier Marshall starring Randolph Scott, which was until 1957 the definitive film of the gunfight story.

Plot
In Fort Griffin, Texas, Ed Bailey comes looking to avenge the death of his brother at the hands of gunslinger John H. "Doc" Holliday. Seeing him in a bar, Holliday's girl, Kate Fisher, returns to Holliday's room, where the two argue while Holliday throws knives at the door - near her once she brings up Holliday's once-prominent family. Well-known marshal Wyatt Earp arrives in Fort Griffin thinking he will take outlaws Ike Clanton and Johnny Ringo into custody, but instead finds out that the local sheriff, Cotton Wilson, released them despite the outstanding warrants for their arrest. Holliday refuses to help the lawman, holding a grudge against Wyatt's brother, Morgan. Holliday kills Bailey with a knife-throw when Bailey attempts to shoot him in the back. Holliday is arrested for murder, though Wyatt and Kate allow him to escape from a lynch mob.

In Dodge City, Kansas, Wyatt finds out that Holliday and Kate are in town. Holliday tells him he has no money, so Wyatt allows him to stay if he promises to not fight while he is in town.  Meanwhile, gambler Laura Denbow is arrested for playing cards since women are not allowed to gamble. She is released and allowed to play in the side rooms of the saloon. Wyatt is forced to deputize Holliday because a bank robber kills a cashier and Wyatt's other deputies are out in a posse catching another outlaw. The bank robbers attempt to ambush Wyatt outside of town, but are instead killed by Wyatt and Holliday.

Back in Dodge City, Holliday learns Kate has left him for Johnny Ringo, who taunts Holliday to a shootout and throws liquor on him. Holliday steadfastly refuses to fight him. Shanghai Pierce and his henchmen ride into town, wound deputy Charlie Bassett and attack a dancehall, but Wyatt and Holliday hold the men and defuse the situation. As Ringo attempts to intervene, Holliday shoots him in the arm. Holliday returns to his room and Kate is waiting for him, but he refuses to take her back. Kate swears she will see him dead. By now, Wyatt and Laura have fallen in love, but when he receives a letter from his brother Virgil, asking him to help clean up Tombstone, Arizona, she refuses to go with him unless he changes into the man she wants him to be. Holliday catches up to Wyatt on the trail and both head to Tombstone.

In Tombstone, Wyatt finds out that Ike Clanton is trying to herd thousands of head of rustled Mexican cattle but cannot as long as the Earps control Tombstone's railway station. Morgan Earp criticizes his brother's association with Holliday, but Wyatt insists the gunslinger is welcome in Tombstone as long as he stays out of trouble. Cotton offers Wyatt a $20,000 bribe if he allows the stolen cattle to be shipped, but Wyatt refuses. He rides out to the Clanton ranch, returning young Billy Clanton to his mother after finding Billy drunk. Wyatt informs Ike that he has been made a U.S. Marshal and has legal authority in every county in the United States. Finding no recourse, the Clantons decide to ambush Wyatt as he makes his nightly rounds but kill his younger brother James Earp by mistake.

The next morning, Ike and five of his henchmen go to Tombstone to face off against the Earps at the O.K. Corral. Holliday, who is sick from tuberculosis, joins them. Though Virgil and Morgan are wounded in the gunfight, all six in Clanton's gang are killed, including Billy, who is given a chance to surrender, but refuses. After the fight is over, Wyatt joins Holliday for a final drink before heading off to California to meet Laura, as promised.

Cast

Production

Writing
The screenplay by Leon Uris is based on a 1954 article entitled The Killer in Holiday Magazine
by George Scullin. The film’s plot contains numerous historical inaccuracies and takes liberties with actual events at the real gunfight at the O.K. Corral.

A decade later, director John Sturges made a more historically accurate version named Hour of the Gun, starring James Garner as Wyatt Earp, Jason Robards as Doc Holliday and Robert Ryan as Ike Clanton.  This film begins with a more accurate version of the O.K. Corral gun battle, then covers its aftermath.

Filming
Sturges made portions of the movie on the set of Paramount Ranch.

Reception

Box office
The film was a big hit and earned $4.7 million on its first run and $6 million on re-release.

Critical response
Reviews in 1957 were generally positive. Bosley Crowther of The New York Times praised the film as "firmly directed" and "ruggedly acted," though he lamented "odd, embarrassing moments when Cupid lets fly with his arrows," and thought that the inclusion of a ballad was too derivative of High Noon. Variety called Lancaster and Douglas "excellently cast" and added, "in its development and exciting climax John Sturges has captured the stirring spirit of the period in his sock direction." Harrison's Reports agreed that the two leads were "excellent in their respective roles" and found the action "tense and suspenseful throughout, culminating in a highly exciting and thrilling gun battle." Richard L. Coe of The Washington Post deemed the film "just what its title suggests — blood-thirsty, empty-headed and good fun of its sort." The Monthly Film Bulletin called it "carefully and lavishly mounted, but it is ultimately overlong and overwrought. Leon Uris's script dulls the final scene of action by the introduction of too many minor climaxes, which never blend."

Its Dimitri Tiomkin score, featuring the song "Gunfight at the O.K. Corral", with lyrics by Ned Washington, sung by Frankie Laine, pushes the movie's momentum relentlessly throughout.

Members of the Western Writers of America chose the song "Gunfight at the O.K. Corral" as one of the Top 100 Western songs of all time.

Accolades
The film was nominated for two Academy Awards for Best Film Editing (Warren Low) and Best Sound Recording (George Dutton). Burt Lancaster and Kirk Douglas were nominated for Golden Laurel in the category of top male action star.

See also
 Hour of the Gun 1967 remake by John Sturges with James Garner
 List of American films of 1957

References

External links

 Gunfight at the O.K. Corral at Apacheland Movie Ranch
 
 
 
 
 

1957 films
1957 Western (genre) films
American Western (genre) films
Biographical films about Wyatt Earp
Cochise County conflict
Cultural depictions of Bat Masterson
Cultural depictions of Big Nose Kate
Cultural depictions of Doc Holliday
Cultural depictions of Johnny Ringo
Cultural depictions of Wyatt Earp
Films about brothers
Films about tuberculosis
Films directed by John Sturges
Films produced by Hal B. Wallis
Films scored by Dimitri Tiomkin
Films set in 1881
Films set in Kansas
Films set in Texas
Films set in Tombstone, Arizona
Films shot in California
Films about gambling
Paramount Pictures films
1950s English-language films
1950s American films